Barry Wappett was a baseball player at the 1956 Melbourne Olympics.

References

Baseball players at the 1956 Summer Olympics